Colorization, colourization, colorisation, or colourisation may refer to: 
Film colorization – a process that adds color to black and white, sepia or monochrome moving-picture images
Hand-colouring – methods of manually adding colour to a black-and-white photograph or other image